Oncideres diringsi is a species of beetle in the family Cerambycidae. It was described by Martins and Galileo in 1990. It is known from Ecuador and Brazil.

References

diringsi
Beetles described in 1990